The Aviators (released as Flying Heroes in some countries) is a 2008 Spanish-language Catalonian animated adventure film directed by Miquel Pujol from a script by him and Ibán Roca. Produced by Accio Studios, the plot concerns the true story of Cher Ami, a bird that lives on a French farm, who enlists in World War I to become a war pigeon so he can be regarded as a hero. The soundtrack, composed by Manel Gil and performed by the Bratislava Symphony Orchestra, features the vocals of Spanish singer Nina. The Aviators had its world premiere at the San Sebastián International Film Festival on 26 September 2008, before being theatrically released in Spain on 19 June 2009. It won Best Animated Film at the 2nd Gaudí Awards.

Premise 
Cher Ami, a bird living on a French farm in 1918, enlists in World War I alongside a dove and a mouse in order to become a war pigeon in the hope of being regarded as a hero by his peers.

Production 
The film combines traditional 2D animation with 3D computer-animation. Director Miquel Pujol compared the style to older Disney films.

Release 
The Aviators had its world premiere at the San Sebastián International Film Festival on 26 September 2008, before being theatrically released in Spain on 19 June 2009, for a gross of $181,233.

See also 
Valiant – a film with a similar premise

References

External links 
Credits

2008 films
2008 animated films
2000s adventure films
Spanish animated films
2000s Spanish-language films
Spanish adventure films